The 2020 BSL All-Star Game, officially called the 2020 ING All-Star Game for sponsorship reasons, was held on January 19, 2020, at the Sinan Erdem Dome, Istanbul. The attendance was reportedly 15,000 as the tickets were sold out.

Yalçın Granit, 87 year-old former basketball player, was given the "All-Time All-Star Award" in the event.

All-Star Game

Coaches 
Ergin Ataman of Anadolu Efes was named as the head coach for the Red Team and Ufuk Sarıca of Pınar Karşıyaka was named as the head coach for the White Team.

Rosters 
The format was different from the previous contests. Two teams, Red Team and White Team, competed in the event. Shane Larkin of Anadolu Efes and Nando de Colo of Fenerbahçe were named as the team captains for the Red Team and White Team, respectively. On January 12, the captains took turns drafting from the pool of 22 players.

 Notes
 Italics indicates the team captains.

 Vasilije Micić was unable to play due to injury.
 Yiğit Arslan was unable to play due to injury.
 Derrick Williams was unable to play due to injury.
 Rodrigue Beaubois was selected as Vasilije Micić's replacement.
 Aaron Harrison was selected as Yiğit Arslan's replacement.

Game

All-Star Organizations

Shooting Contest 
The Shooting Contest, presented by Lenovo, involved a current BSL player, a retired male player, and a retired female player competing together in a shooting competition.

The competition was time based, involving shooting from four locations of increasing difficulty and making all four shots in sequential order. The first shot was a 3-meter shot from the right angle, the second was straight-on jump shot from the free throw line, the third was a three-point shot from the left angle and the fourth is a half-court shot. There was a two-minute time limit for each attempt and the top time won the competition.

Three-Point Contest 
The Three-Point Contest was presented by Nesine.com.

Slam Dunk Contest 
The Slam Dunk Contest was presented by ING. Contestants made 4 dunks in a single round. The judges were Ömer Saybir, Muratcan Güler, Nevriye Yılmaz, Ben Fero and Ozan Güven.

 Derrick Williams was unable to play due to injury.

References

All-Star
Basketbol Süper Ligi All-Star Game